Commissioner James M. Knaggs (born December 5, 1950, in the United States) was the Territorial Commander of The Salvation Army, USA Western Territory.

Officership
Date of Commissioning: December 6, 1976Session Name: The Overcomers

James Knaggs was commissioned as a Salvation Army Officer in 1976, in the USA Eastern Territory. Following a brief appointment at Eastern Pennsylvania and Delaware Divisional Headquarters, he became a Corps Officer with his wife Carolyn.

Following seven years as Corps leaders James and Carolyn were appointed to the Greater New York Division where as Captains, they were appointed as Divisional Youth Secretary and Divisional Corps Cadet Counsellor respectively.

In 1987 James and Carolyn were appointed to the Youth Department at Territorial Headquarters. In 1989 they returned to the Eastern Pennsylvania and Delaware Division where James became the Divisional Secretary and Divisional Men's Fellowship Secretary and Carolyn was appointed as Divisional League of Mercy Secretary.

Following three years at the Divisional Headquarters (DHQ), James was appointed as Territorial Youth Secretary in 1992 and then in 1994 he became Territorial Evangelism and Corps Growth Secretary. During this time, his wife Carolyn had the positions of Territorial Corps Cadets and Junior Soldiers Bureau Director and Territorial Stewardship Bureau Director.

In 1996, as Majors, James became General Secretary for Field Operations at Greater New York Division and Carolyn was appointed as Divisional Director of Volunteers and Current Issues Secretary with additional chaplaincy responsibilities.

As Lieut-Colonels, in 1999, James and Carolyn became the leaders of the Eastern Pennsylvania and Delaware Division as Divisional Commander and Associate Divisional Commander.

Appointments for James and Carolyn (now Colonels) as Territorial Secretary for Personnel and Territorial League of Mercy Secretary in 2000 were soon followed in 2003 with appointments to Chief Secretary and Territorial Secretary for Women's Ministries; Fellowship of the Silver Star in the USA Eastern Territory.

In June 2006 James and Carolyn were promoted to the rank of Commissioner and appointed as Territorial Commander and Territorial President of Women's Ministries in the Australia Southern Territory.

Jim was innovative in his approach to leadership and communication in the Southern Territory, establishing a large followership on his blog, Twitter and Facebook accounts. Among several significant initiatives was his ambitious "210 in 2010" appeal, whose principal aim was to increase the number of Corps and Mission Centres in the territory dramatically.

History has shown us and our conviction remains, that starting new corps or local centers for mission is the most effective means of fulfilling the great commission and bringing people to Jesus. Our campaign is called 210 in 2010. By the end of next year we want to have 210 corps.

In July 2010 James and Carolyn began their new appointments as Territorial Commander and Territorial President of Women's Ministries in the USA Western Territory.

On July 29, 2013 James was called to London, UK with other members of The Salvation Army's High Council to elect the next General as worldwide leader of that organization.  James was one of six men nominated, one declined to be placed on the ballots.  That body elected Andre Cox to be General.

Appointments

Education / Qualifications
 Master of Professional Studies in Urban Ministries, Alliance Theological Seminary, February 20, 1995

Previous Occupations
 Project Coordinator - Education for Parenting

Personal life
Of James and Carolyn, The Salvation Army Australia Southern Territory's Archives and Heritage Museum writes:

Growing up with Salvationists parents The Salvation Army has always been their place of worship. They have a deep love for Jesus and are extremely grateful for the example shown them by their parents and faithful local officers.

They continually desire to intelligently discern what God requires of them and, in Christ's strength, to enthusiastically follow his plan for them. They passionately want to be used to bring people into God's kingdom.

Publications

References

External links
 The Salvation Army International Homepage 
 The Salvation Army Australia Southern Territory Homepage
 TCSpeak
 Introduction and Chapter One from "ONE DAY" listed above

1950 births
Living people
American Salvationists
Australian Salvationists
Salvation Army officers